Laiphognathus multimaculatus, the spotty blenny, is a species of combtooth blenny found in the western Pacific and Indian Oceans. It can reach a maximum length of  SL, and is a commercial aquarium fish.

References

multimaculatus
Fish described in 1955